Francis Leslie Pym, Baron Pym,  (13 February 1922 – 7 March 2008) was a British Conservative Party politician who served in various Cabinet positions in the 1970s and 1980s, including Foreign, Defence and Northern Ireland Secretary, and Leader of the House of Commons. He was Member of Parliament (MP) for Cambridgeshire (South East Cambridgeshire after 1983) from 1961 to 1987. Pym was made a life peer in 1987.

Early life 
Pym was born at Penpergwm Lodge, near Abergavenny in Monmouthshire. His father, Leslie Pym, was also an MP, while his grandfather, the Rt Revd Walter Pym, was Bishop of Bombay. He was not a direct descendant of the 17th-century parliamentarian John Pym as has been commonly held (see Pym's own published family history), but a collateral descendant.

He was educated at Eton, before going on to Magdalene College, Cambridge. For much of the Second World War, Pym served in North Africa and Italy as a captain and regimental adjutant in the 9th Lancers. He was mentioned in despatches twice, awarded the Military Cross, and ended his military service as a major. Pym was a managing director and landowner before he went into politics.

Political career 
Pym entered politics as a member of Herefordshire County Council in 1958. He contested Rhondda West without success in 1959 and entered Parliament in 1961 at a by-election as MP for Cambridgeshire. He held the seat until 1983, and thereafter was MP for South East Cambridgeshire until 1987. He was an opposition whip from 1964 and served under Edward Heath as Government Chief Whip (1970–1973) and Northern Ireland Secretary (1973–1974), and Margaret Thatcher as Defence Secretary (1979–1981), Leader of the House of Commons and Lord President of the Council (1981–1982). He became foreign secretary during the Falklands War in 1982 following Lord Carrington's resignation, but was removed by Thatcher the following year after her second election victory.

Pym was a leading member of the "wets", Conservative MPs skeptical of Thatcherism. During the 1983 general election campaign he said on the BBC's Question Time that "Landslides don't on the whole produce successful governments". This was publicly repudiated by Thatcher and he was sacked after the election. Shortly afterwards, he launched a pressure group called Conservative Centre Forward to argue for more centrist, one-nation policies but with Thatcher at the height of her powers, it was unsuccessful. He stood down at the 1987 election and was created a life peer as Baron Pym (of Sandy in the County of Bedfordshire) on 9 October 1987.

The book is a guide to the Wets' opposition to Thatcher's leadership style and politics.

He was portrayed by Jeremy Child in the 2002 BBC production of Ian Curteis's The Falklands Play, by Julian Wadham in the 2011 film The Iron Lady and by Guy Siner in the fourth series of The Crown.

Personal life 
Pym died in Sandy, Bedfordshire, on 7 March 2008 after a prolonged illness, aged 86.
He was survived by his wife, Valerie (1929–2017), whom he married on 25 June 1949, and their four children.

Arms

References

Bibliography

External links 

 
 
Obituary, The Guardian, 7 March 2008
Obituary, The Times, 8 March 2008
Obituary, The Independent, 8 March 2008
 Obituary, The Daily Telegraph, 8 March 2008

1922 births
2008 deaths
9th Queen's Royal Lancers officers
Alumni of Magdalene College, Cambridge
British Army personnel of World War II
British people of the Falklands War
British Secretaries of State
British Secretaries of State for Foreign and Commonwealth Affairs
Chancellors of the Duchy of Lancaster
Conservative Party (UK) life peers
Conservative Party (UK) MPs for English constituencies
Councillors in Herefordshire
Deputy Lieutenants of Cambridgeshire
Leaders of the House of Commons of the United Kingdom
Lord Presidents of the Council
Members of the Privy Council of the United Kingdom
People educated at Eton College
People from Abergavenny
Recipients of the Military Cross
Secretaries of State for Defence (UK)
Secretaries of State for Northern Ireland
UK MPs 1959–1964
UK MPs 1964–1966
UK MPs 1966–1970
UK MPs 1970–1974
UK MPs 1974
UK MPs 1974–1979
UK MPs 1979–1983
UK MPs 1983–1987
United Kingdom Paymasters General
Welsh military personnel
People from Sandy, Bedfordshire
Life peers created by Elizabeth II